Sean Christie (born April 21, 1974) is the Chief Executive Officer of Carver Road Capital.  Previously, Christie served as the President of Events and Nightlife for MGM Resorts International,  as well as the Executive Vice President of Business Development for Wynn Resorts and the Chief Operating Officer and the Vice President of Operations at Wynn Las Vegas.  Before that he served as the founder and owner of Las Vegas Nightlife Group and managing partner of Encore Las Vegas Beach Club, Surrender Night Club, and Andrea’s Restaurant at the Wynn Las Vegas.

Personal life 
Christie was born in Boston, MA, and began helping at the family restaurant in Boston at age seven. He attended Northeastern University and currently resides in Las Vegas, NV with his daughter. He regularly donates time and capital to Keep Memory Alive, supporting the Cleveland Clinic, a non-profit academic medical center.

Christie cites his parents as his greatest influence.

Career

Boston years 
Sean Christie began his career in nightlife and hospitality in 1993 working for the Lyons Group in Boston. There he managed and promoted Karma Club, Bill’s Bar and Lounge, and Avalon.

Las Vegas entrepreneur 
In 2000, Christie relocated to Las Vegas, Nevada, to assist in the opening and management of The House of Blues at Mandalay Bay Resort and Casino. From 2001 to 2006, he also worked as managing partner of The Light Group, a hospitality development and management company with Las Vegas entertainment venues Jet and Light, lounges Mist and Caramel, and restaurants Stack and Fix.

In 2006, Sean Christie launched Las Vegas Nightlife Group, a Las Vegas entertainment consulting firm. One of the firm's key clients has been CityCenter Las Vegas, for which the company promoted Mandarin Oriental, Las Vegas, Vdara Hotel and Spa, and Veer Towers. The firm has also assisted in the opening of Bare Pool Lounge at The Mirage Hotel and Casino and the DayDream Las Vegas Pool Club, serving as Christie’s first day-club concept for the M Resort.

Sean Christie was hired by Wynn Las Vegas in 2007 as managing partner to create the first “boutique” nightclub in Las Vegas, Blush Boutique Nightclub, focusing on “service, ambience and upscale cool over size and flash." For the venue, Christie brought in popular DJs including DJ Kaskade and Blush was noted as successful until its close in 2011. Wynn then commissioned Christie in 2008 to partner with Chef Kim Canteenwalla and Elizabeth Blau to create Society Café at Encore Las Vegas.

His next project at Wynn Las Vegas was collaborating on the concept and opening of Encore Beach Club and Surrender Nightclub in the five-diamond resort Encore at Wynn Las Vegas in 2010. Christie brought in popular DJs such as Tiësto, Skrillex, Deadmau5 and Avicii to both venues and as a result, the Encore Beach Club has been voted "Dayclub of the Year" and "Best Las Vegas Adult Pool Party".

Christie debuted Andrea’s in December 2012 with executive chef Joseph Elevado. Andrea's is an Asian restaurant concept in Encore Las Vegas which is adjacent to the expansive Encore Beach Club complex.

Christie was named one of “Dance Music’s Most Influential Executives” in 2012 by Billboard magazine, which cited that he “commands one of the most powerful and lucrative platforms for DJs in the country."

Christie also spearheaded a Wynn Las Vegas filming initiative, for which he assembled a team in 2013 to source and acquire film, television, and publishing opportunities for the resort. As a result, the Wynn was prominently featured in Paul Blart: Mall Cop 2, Frank and Lola  and The House starring Will Ferrell and Amy Poehler. 

In January 2018, Sean Christie joined MGM Resorts International as President of Events and Nightlife, where he oversaw all owned and leased day and nightlife venues and provided strategic direction around special events programming. During his tenure at MGM, Christie spearheaded Juniper Cocktail Lounge, Roy Choi’s restaurant concept Best Friend, On The Record Speakeasy and Club, and Mama Rabbit Mezcal + Tequila Bar at Park MGM.  Christie also led the opening of the Mayfair Supper Club, a 10,000-square-foot old-school supper club-style concept located at the Bellagio in the space formally occupied by the lounge Hyde. The concept of the Mayfair stems from shifting tastes and Las Vegas guests searching for new nightlife experience, and features exemplary cuisine and live performances including the Mayfair Jazz Trio.

Carver Road Hospitality 

Recently, Christie has partnered with real estate and marketing executive Nelson Famadas to launch Carver Road Capital. The venture will invest in, develop, and operate lifestyle hotels, restaurants, lounges and other hospitality concepts, both domestically and internationally. 

In July 2021, Carver Road announced plans to open a multi-concept venue Flanker Kitchen + Sporting Club to Salt Lake City, opening in December 2021. The 17,500-square-foot multi-concept complex features a restaurant, three bars, 400-square-feet of LED screens, private karaoke and golf simulator rooms, a central sporting club/nightclub, and a cocktail lounge. Located across from Vivant Arena at The Gateway, the venue was designed by award-winning international design studio DesignAgency and a menu by culinary director Jeannine Glass.  

On December 30, 2021, Carver Road opens Carversteak, there its highly-anticipated luxury steakhouse located at Resorts World Las Vegas. The 14,500-square-foot Carversteak is the first Las Vegas dining concept conceived and developed by Carver Road Hospitality, with a menu designed by acclaimed Chef Daniel Ontiveros and a cocktail program developed by  Carver Road Hospitality's Vice President of Beverage & Hospitality Culture, Francesco Lafranconi. Designed by award-winning international design studio DesignAgency, Carversteak features a mid-century modern aesthetic with a rich palette inspired by the landscape of Las Vegas.

References 

1974 births
Living people
People from the Las Vegas Valley
Businesspeople from Boston